Dorcas is a female given name. It derives from Dorcas, a figure from Acts of the Apostles in the New Testament.

Persons named Dorcas include:
 Dorcas ye blackmore (c. 1620–after 1677), one of the first named African Americans to settle in New England
 Dorcas Ajoke Adesokan (born 1998), Nigerian badminton player
 Dorcas Blackwood, 1st Baroness Dufferin and Claneboye (1726–1807), Northern Irish personage
Dorcas Brigham (1896-1986), American botanist, horticulturist
 Dorcas Cochran (c. 1903–1991), American lyricist and screenwriter
 Dorcas Coker-Appiah (born 1946), Ghanaian lawyer and women's rights activist
 Dorcas Denhartog (born 1965), American skier
 Dorcas Drake (1916–1993), American philanthropist
 Dorcas Good (ca. 1687/1688–?), child accused of witchcraft at the Salem witch trials
 Dorcas Gyimah (born 1992), Ghanaian sprinter
 Dorcas Fellows (1873–1938), American librarian
 Dorcas Hardy (1946-2019), American government official
 Dorcas Hoar (c. 1634–1711), widow accused of witchcraft at the Salem witch trials
 Dorcas Honorable (c. 1770–1855), Native American, last indigenous inhabitant of Nantucket
 Dorcas Kelly (died 1761), Irish brothel keeper and alleged serial killer
 Dorcas Makgato-Malesu, Botswanan cabinet minister
 Dorcas Martin (1537–1599), English bookseller active in religious controversies
 Dorcas Murunga (born 1969), Kenyan volleyball player
 Dorcas Muthoni, Kenyan entrepreneur
 Dorcas Nakhomicha Ndasaba (born 1971), Kenyan volleyball player
 Dorcas Reilly (born 1926), Inventor of Green Bean Casserole

See also
Dorka Gryllus (born 1972), Hungarian actress

Feminine given names